Jeff Kepner is the first ever recipient of double hand transplant surgery in the United States. The surgery was performed at the University of Pittsburgh Medical Center on Monday May 4, 2009. Kepner lost both hands and feet in 1999 from a strep infection.

The organ donor whose hands Kepner received was Jeffrey Keen, a 23-year-old from Clearfield, PA.

See also
 Clint Hallam

References

Hand transplant recipients
Year of birth missing (living people)
Living people
Place of birth missing (living people)
American amputees